The 1947 New York Giants season was the franchise's 65th season. The team finished in fourth place in the National League with an 81–73 record, 13 games behind the Brooklyn Dodgers. It was the first season to be broadcast on television, with WNBT acting as the official team television broadcast partner.

Offseason 
 December 19, 1946: Harry Danning was released by the Giants.
 Prior to 1947 season: Nick Testa was acquired by the Giants from the Walden Hummingbirds.

Regular season 
April 18: In the third inning of a game against the Brooklyn Dodgers, Dave Koslo gave up Jackie Robinson's first major league home run.
April 19: 32,355 paying fans and 736 servicemen set the record for the biggest Saturday attendance at the Polo Grounds. Jackie Robinson had three at bats and had two singles and one double. The Giants still managed to win the game by a score of 4–3.

Between September 5 and 23, the Giants hit at least one home run in each of 19 games, the longest such streak in franchise history (considering records from 1914 onwards).

Season standings

Record vs. opponents

Opening Day lineup 
Centerfield: Fuzz White
Shortstop: Bill Rigney
Leftfield: Clint Hartung
First base: Johnny Mize
Rightfield: Willard Marshall
Catcher: Walker Cooper
Third base: Sid Gordon
Second base: Bobby Thomson
Pitcher: Bill Voiselle

Notable transactions 
 April 12, 1947: Jess Pike was released by the Giants.

Roster

Player stats

Batting

Starters by position 
Note: Pos = Position; G = Games played; AB = At bats; H = Hits; Avg. = Batting average; HR = Home runs; RBI = Runs batted in

Other batters 
Note: G = Games played; AB = At bats; H = Hits; Avg. = Batting average; HR = Home runs; RBI = Runs batted in

Pitching

Starting pitchers 
Note: G = Games pitched; IP = Innings pitched; W = Wins; L = Losses; ERA = Earned run average; SO = Strikeouts

Other pitchers 
Note: G = Games pitched; IP = Innings pitched; W = Wins; L = Losses; ERA = Earned run average; SO = Strikeouts

Relief pitchers 
Note: G = Games pitched; W = Wins; L = Losses; SV = Saves; ERA = Earned run average; SO = Strikeouts

Farm system 

LEAGUE CHAMPIONS: Seaford

Notes

References 
 1947 New York Giants team at Baseball-Reference
 1947 New York Giants team at Baseball Almanac

New York Giants (NL)
San Francisco Giants seasons
New York Giants season
New York
1940s in Manhattan
Washington Heights, Manhattan